The SS Argus was a steel-hulled Great Lakes freighter, that was constructed as the SS Lewis Woodruff by the American Ship Building Company, and was launched on 5 August 1905. Its original owner was the Gilchrist Transportation Company, based in Cleveland, Ohio. In 1913, the ship was sold to the Interlake Steamship Company, and was renamed the Argus.

The ship was lost on Lake Huron on November 9, 1913 during the Great Lakes storm of 1913. Under the commander of captain Paul Dutch, the Argus headed north into Lake Huron, with a load of coal. A little over 13 miles north of Point Aux Barques, the ship broke in two and sank with the loss of all 25 hands. The SS Hydrus, sister ship of the Argus, was also lost in the storm.

Portions of the wreckage were found by a local doctor along the shoreline at Bayfield, Ontario in mid-November 1913. The remains of the ship was discovered in 1972, by diver Dick Race. The wreck lies upside down, in about 250 feet of water.

References

Maritime incidents in 1913
Shipwrecks of Lake Huron
Ships lost with all hands
1905 ships
Ships built in Lorain, Ohio
Great Lakes freighters
Shipwreck discoveries by John Steele